The Jerry E. Clegg Botanic Garden (also called the Clegg Memorial Garden) is a botanical garden in Lafayette, Indiana in the United States.

The garden is next to Wildcat Creek. It has prairie and oak savanna environs. Plants in the garden are native Indiana flora. The main goal of the park is to reintroduce native plants and animals to the Lafayette area.

See also
 List of botanical gardens and arboretums in Indiana

References

External links
Clegg Botanic Gardens video from the Journal-Courier

Botanical gardens in Indiana
Protected areas of Tippecanoe County, Indiana